Stirling University RFC is a rugby union club based in Stirling, Scotland. The club operates a men's team and a women's team. Both currently play in the university leagues.

History

The club was founded in 1967. The club announced a partnership with Super 6 side Stirling County in 2019.

Cathy Gallagher, the University of Stirling Executive Director of Sport, who also has a place on the Stirling County board, stated:
This is an extremely exciting opportunity for the University, placing us at the top table of an ambitious new venture in Scottish sport. The partnership has so much room to grow and we look forward to working with Stirling County to unlock the franchise’s potential and take the sport of rugby to a new level in the Caledonia region, as well as adding to the sporting prowess and aspirations of the city of Stirling.

Stirling University now offer rugby union scholarships to students.

Sides

The men's team has a 1st and 2nd XV.

Both men and women train at the Rubber Crumb 3G pitch at Stirling University.

Men's training is on Monday nights 8.30-10pm, Tuesday 2-4pm, and Friday 3–4.30pm. In addition they have a gym session at Stirling County RFC on Monday mornings between 8 and 9am.

Women's training is on Monday afternoons 4–5.30pm and Thursday afternoons 4-6pm. In addition they have a gym session on Tuesday afternoons between 4.30-5.30pm.

Sevens

The club run the Stirling University Sevens tournament.

Honours

Men

 Scottish Conference 1A
 Champions (3): 2006–07, 2008–09, 2017–18
 Scottish Conference 2A
 Champions (1): 2015-16
 McLaren HSFP Sevens
 Champions (1): 1995

Women

 Scottish Conference 1A
 Champions (3): 2010–11, 2016–17, 2019–20

Notable former players

Men

Canada

The following former Stirling University RFC players have represented Canada at senior international level.

Women

Scotland

The following former Stirling University RFC players have represented Scotland at senior international level.

References

Rugby union in Stirling
Scottish rugby union teams
University and college rugby union clubs in Scotland